Andrew J. Shortland is an archaeologist at Cranfield University where he is director of the Cranfield Forensic Institute (CFI), a position he has held since 2016.

Shortland established the Centre for Archaeological and Forensic Analysis at Cranfield in 2005 after having worked in the Ministry of Defence for six years.

Life

Education 
Shortland earned a BA in Geology at the University of Oxford. He holds a PhD from the University of Oxford with his dissertation: Vitreous materials at Amarna : the production of glass and faience in 18th Dynasty Egypt.

Works

Thesis

Books 
As author

As editor

References

External links 
 Professor Andrew Shortland at Cranfield University
 Andrew J. Shortland at WorldCat

Living people
21st-century archaeologists
Academics of Cranfield University
Year of birth missing (living people)